Alex Andrianopoulos (born 1 January 1955) is a former Australian politician. He was a Labor member of the Victorian Legislative Assembly, representing St Albans from 1985 to 1992 and Mill Park from 1992 to 2002. He was Speaker from 1999 to 2002.

Andrianopoulos was born in Tselepakou in Tripoli, Greece, and was educated in the St Albans area of Victoria, his family having migrated to Australia in 1965. He joined the Labor Party in 1974. In 1976, he became a paymaster with Modern Maid & Staff, and in 1980 he was elected to Keilor City Council. He served on the council until 1984, and was also an electorate officer from 1982 to 1985.

In 1985, Andrianopoulos won the Victorian Legislative Assembly seat of St Albans for the ALP, and moved to Mill Park in 1992 when his former seat was abolished. He was briefly Shadow Minister for Ethnic Affairs from March to December 1993, and was Secretary to the Shadow Cabinet from October 1992 to March 1993, and again from December 1993 to October 1999. When Labor won office under Steve Bracks in the 1999 state election, Andrianopoulos was elected Speaker of the Assembly. He held the post until his retirement from politics in 2002.

References

1955 births
Living people
Australian Labor Party members of the Parliament of Victoria
Members of the Victorian Legislative Assembly
Speakers of the Victorian Legislative Assembly
Greek emigrants to Australia
21st-century Australian politicians
Politicians from Melbourne